The 2022 Indian presidential election was the 16th presidential election in India which was held in 2022 to elect the president of India as the term of incumbent president Ram Nath Kovind was about to expire. The election took place on 18 July 2022 with a turnout of 99.12%.

BJP candidate Droupadi Murmu won the election, defeating Yashwant Sinha, the candidate of the opposition, by a margin of 296,626 votes. That led Murmu to be the 15th President of India, the first tribal and second woman to do so. She is also the first President to be born after independence and is the youngest to occupy the top post.

Electoral system

The President of India is indirectly elected by an electoral college consisting of the elected members of both houses of parliament, the elected members of the legislative assemblies of the 28 states and the elected members of the legislative assemblies of the union territories of Delhi, Puducherry and Jammu and Kashmir. As of 2022, the electoral college comprises 776 MPs and 4,033 MLAs (excluding the 90 MLAs of currently dissolved and recently delimited Jammu and Kashmir Legislative Assembly).

The election commission assigns varying numbers of votes to these electoral college members, such that the total weight of MPs and those of MLAs is roughly equal and that the voting power of states and territories is proportional to their population. Overall the members of the electoral college are eligible to cast 1,086,431 votes, yielding a threshold for a majority of 543,216 votes.

The nomination of a candidate for election to the office of the President must be subscribed by at least 50 electors as proposers and 50 electors as seconders. The election is held by means of a secret ballot under the Instant-runoff voting system. The manner of election of the President is provided by Article 55 of the Constitution.

Article 58 of the Indian Constitution provides that the President and Vice President of India must be citizens of India, and at least 35 years old. The Presidential candidate must be qualified for elections in the same way as a member of the Lok Sabha, and must not hold any office of profit under the Indian government. Candidates for the presidency typically seek the nomination of one of the political parties, in which case each party devises a method (such as a primary election) to choose the candidate the party deems best suited to run for the position. Traditionally, the primary elections are indirect elections where voters cast ballots for a slate of party delegates pledged to a particular candidate. The party's delegates then officially nominate a candidate to run on the party's behalf. The general election in July is also an indirect election, where voters cast ballots for a slate of members of the Electoral College; these electors in turn directly elect the president and vice president.

By convention, the Secretary General, Lok Sabha and the Secretary General, Rajya Sabha are appointed as the Returning Officers by rotation. For the 2017 Presidential election, the Secretary General, Lok Sabha was appointed as Returning Officer. Therefore, for the 2022 Presidential election, the Secretary General, Rajya Sabha Shri P.C. Mody was appointed as the Returning Officer in Notification by ECI on 13 June 2022.

Election schedule 
Under sub-section (1) of Section (4) of the Presidential and Vice-Presidential Elections Act 1952, the schedule for the election of the President of India was announced by the Election Commission of India on 9 June 2022.

Electoral college

Electoral college member strength

Electoral college vote value composition

 All 4 Rajya Sabha seats and 90 State Legislative Assembly seats of Jammu and Kashmir are vacant as the Jammu and Kashmir Legislative Assembly is dissolved. 
 The lone Rajya Sabha seat of Tripura is vacant.
 7 seats of the state legislative assemblies across various states (4 of Gujarat, 1 each of Maharashtra, Tripura and West Bengal) are also vacant.

Party-wise vote (projection)

Candidates 
On 21 June 2022, Yashwant Sinha, a former AITC leader, was unanimously chosen as the common candidate of UPA and other opposition parties for the 2022 Presidential election. On the same day NDA chose Droupadi Murmu as its presidential candidate.

National Democratic Alliance

United Opposition (India)

Potential Candidates 
• Vice President - Venkaiah Naidu

Campaign 
During her election campaign, Murmu visited various states seeking support for her candidature. Several opposition parties like BJD, JMM, BSP, SS, YSRCP, SAD, JDS among others had announced support for her candidature prior to polling.

Incidents 
Congress filed a complaint with the Election Commission against Droupadi Murmu and BJP leaders, alleging poll code violation in Karnataka. The Congress party alleged that the ruling BJP had influenced the MLAs by offering bribes and other inducements in violation of the election code. The MLAs were called for training on voting in the presidential election and allegedly provided luxurious rooms, meals, liquor, drinks and entertainment.

Results

Breakdown

Reactions 
Right after Murmu was announced as the winner, numerous congratulations and wishes were posted globally. Russian President Vladimir Putin extended his greetings to Droupadi Murmu for being elected as the President of India and hoped for further development of the Russian-Indian political dialogue and productive cooperation in different areas under her leadership. President of the United States, Joe Biden, congratulated her and called her victory the 'strength of Indian democracy'. Chinese President Xi Jinping congratulated her and said that he would be willing to work with her to enhance political mutual trust between China and India. The Presidents of Nepal, Sri Lanka, Maldives, Bangladesh and other countries also congratulated her.

After the election results came out, tribal communities in several states celebrated her victory. Many minority tribal communities in Bangladesh specially the Santal community also celebrated her win.

See also 
 2022 elections in India
 2022 Indian vice presidential election
 List of Indian presidential elections
 List of presidents of India

References

2022
 
July 2022 events in India